La Mesada may refer to: 

 Argentina:
 La Mesada (Iruya)
 La Mesada, Catamarca